Justice Turner may refer to:

Abe W. Turner (1893–1947), associate justice of the Utah Supreme Court
Bates Turner, associate justice of the Arkansas Supreme Court
Edward Turner (judge), associate justice of the Supreme Court of Mississippi
Edward C. Turner, associate justice of the Supreme Court of Ohio
George Turner (Nevada judge) (1828–1885), associate justice of the Territorial Supreme Court of Nevada
George Turner (American politician), associate justice of the Supreme Court of the Territory of Washington
Henry Gray Turner, associate justice of the Supreme Court of Georgia
Jesse Turner (Arkansas judge), associate justice of the Arkansas Supreme Court
Josiah Turner (judge), associate justice of the Vermont Supreme Court
Mark Turner (judge), judge of the High Court of England and Wales
Otis H. Turner, associate justice of the Arkansas Supreme Court
Timothy Turner, chief justice of South Wales

See also
Judge Turner (disambiguation)